Lycaste macrophylla is a species of terrestrial orchid native to Costa Rica, Nicaragua, Panama, Colombia, Ecuador, Venezuela, Peru and Bolivia. It is the type species of the genus Lycaste.

References

External links 

macrophylla
Orchids of Bolivia
Orchids of Colombia
Orchids of Costa Rica
Orchids of Ecuador
Orchids of Nicaragua
Orchids of Panama
Orchids of Peru
Orchids of Venezuela
Taxa named by Eduard Friedrich Poeppig